Epistrophe nitidicollis is a European and North American species of hoverfly.

Description
External images
For terms see Morphology of Diptera
Wing length 8-11·25 mm. Face wide, clear yellow, lightly dusted at eye margin. Legs yellow except dark coxae. Thorax blackish and shiny and tergites equally black and yellow. Similar to E. melanostoma but slightly narrower, tergite 5 with black band and scutellum black-haired. 
 
 The male genitalia are figured by  Hippa (1968). The larva is described and figured by Dusek and Laska(1959) .

Distribution
Palaearctic and Nearctic. Fennoscandia South to Iberia. Ireland East through North, Central and South Europe East into Russia then Siberia to the Pacific coast (Kamchatka, Sakhalin Island). North America from Alaska south to California and South Carolina.

Biology
Habitat is deciduous forest, scrub and maquis. Arboreal, descending to visit flowers of  white umbellifers, Caltha, Cistus, Euphorbia, Prunus, Ranunculus, Rubus, Taraxacum.
The flight period is May to June (earlier in southern Europe, later at higher altitudes and northerly latitudes). The larva feeds on aphids.

References

Diptera of Europe
Syrphinae
Syrphini
Insects described in 1822